Meppayur State assembly constituency was one of the 140 state legislative assembly constituencies in Kerala state in southern India, before the 2008 delimitation of constituencies. It was one of the 7 state legislative assembly constituencies included in the Vatakara Lok Sabha constituency until the 2008 delimitation. The last election to the constituency was conducted in  2006, and the MLA was K. K. Lathika of CPI(M).

After the delimitation in 2008, Kunnummal, Kuttiady, Purameri, Ayancheri, Thiruvallur, Maniyur, and Velom Gram Panchayats became a part of the newly formed Kuttiady (State Assembly constituency), whereas Cheruvannur and Meppayur was added to the Perambra (State Assembly constituency).

Local self governed segments
Meppayur Niyamasabha constituency was composed of the following local self governed segments:

Election history

Election results
Percentage change (±%) denotes the change in the number of votes from the immediately previous election.

Niyamasabha Election 2006
There were 1,61,852 registered voters in Meppayur Constituency for the 2006 Kerala Niyamasabha Election.

Niyama Sabha Election 2001
There were 1,58,091 registered voters in Meppayur Constituency for the 2001 Kerala Niyamasabha Election.

See also
 Meppayur
 Kuttiady (State Assembly constituency)
 Kozhikode district
 List of constituencies of the Kerala Legislative Assembly
 2006 Kerala Legislative Assembly election

References

External links
 

Former assembly constituencies of Kerala